Musnad al-Firdaws is a Sunni collection of Hadiths compiled by the Islamic scholar Abū Manṣūr al-Daylamī (d. 558 AH/1162 CE)

Description
It contains almost three thousand (3000) hadiths according to Maktaba Shamila.  This book is not popular among Islamic scholars because the chain of narrators are not specifically given while quoting Hadith.

Publications
The book has been published by many publishers but mainly in Arabic Language: 
  Musnad al-Firdaws (مخطوطة مسند الفردوس): Published:Maktaba Ustadh Doctor Mohammad bin Torkey, Turkey مكتبة الأستاذ الدكتور محمد بن تركي التركي

See also
 List of Sunni books
 Kutub al-Sittah
 Sahih Muslim
 Jami al-Tirmidhi
 Sunan Abu Dawood
 Jami' at-Tirmidhi
 Either: Sunan ibn Majah, Muwatta Malik
Majma al-Zawa'id

References

Sunni literature
Hadith
Hadith studies
Hadith collections
Hanbali
Sunni hadith collections